This is a detailed list of human spaceflights from 1961 to 1970, spanning the Soviet Vostok and Voskhod programs, the start of the Soviet Soyuz program, the American Mercury and Gemini programs, and the first lunar landings of the American Apollo program.

Red indicates fatalities.
Green indicates sub-orbital spaceflight (including flights that failed to attain intended orbit).
Grey indicates flights to the Moon.
The United States defines spaceflight as any flight reaching an altitude of 50 miles, while the FAI definition requires an altitude of 100 kilometers. During the 1960s, 13 crewed flights of the U.S. North American X-15 rocket plane met the U.S. criteria, of which only two met the FAI's. This article's primary list includes only the latter two flights.  A separate, secondary list gives the other eleven which flew between 50 miles and 100 kilometers.

Flights between 50 miles and 100 kilometers

In addition to the above spaceflights, eleven flights of the North American X-15 reached a maximum altitude above 50 miles but below 100 kilometers, thus satisfying the U.S. definition of spaceflight but failing to surpass the Kármán line.  Among the twelve X-15 pilots, only Neil Armstrong and Joe Engle would travel to space following their participation in the program.  Eleven of the thirteen flights above 50 miles were made in the X-15-3, the program's third plane; only two were made in the X-15-1, its first.

In the below table, "spaceflight" and related phrases refer to the American convention.

See also

List of human spaceflight programs
List of human spaceflights
List of human spaceflights, 1971–1980
List of human spaceflights, 1981–1990
List of human spaceflights, 1991–2000
List of human spaceflights, 2001–2010
List of human spaceflights, 2011–2020
List of human spaceflights, 2021–present

References

Vostok and Voskhod flight history
Mercury flight history
X-15 flight history (altitudes given in feet)
Gemini flight history
Apollo flight history (student resource)
Skylab flight history
Apollo-Soyuz flight history
Space Shuttle flight history infographic
Shenzhou flight history timeline
SpaceShipOne flight history

1961
1960
Spaceflight timelines
1960s-related lists